The men's 110 metres hurdles event at the 1967 Pan American Games was held in Winnipeg, Manitoba on 2 and 4 August.

Medalists

Results

Heats
Wind:Heat 1: ? m/s, Heat 2: +3.0 m/s

Final
Wind: +1.3 m/s

References

Athletics at the 1967 Pan American Games
1967